Samuel B. "Frosty" Holt (August 20, 1902 – May 24, 1986) was an American football, basketball, and baseball coach and college athletics administrator. He served as the head football coach at Carson–Newman College—now known as Carson–Newman University—in Jefferson City, Tennessee from 1929 to 1949, compiling a record of 94–57–16.

Coaching career
Holt was the head coach for the William & Mary Tribe men's basketball team for the 1945–46 season. In his sole year at the program's helm, Holt compiled 10–10 record with a mark of 5–5 in Southern Conference play.

Death
Holt died on May 24, 1986, at a hospital in Jefferson City, Tennessee.

Head coaching record

Football

References

External links
 

1902 births
1986 deaths
American men's basketball coaches
American men's basketball players
Carson–Newman Eagles athletic directors
Carson–Newman Eagles baseball coaches
Carson–Newman Eagles football coaches
Carson–Newman Eagles men's basketball coaches
Carson–Newman Eagles men's basketball players
William & Mary Tribe baseball coaches
William & Mary Tribe men's basketball coaches